ActivePresenter is all-in-one screencasting, video editing, and eLearning authoring software for Microsoft Windows and macOS, which is developed by Atomi Systems, Inc.

Features

eLearning Authoring Tool 
An outstanding feature of ActivePresenter is to design interactive eLearning courses. It provides users with 11 easy and ready-to-use question templates namely True/False, Multiple Choice, Drag-n-Drop, etc. ActivePresenter supports exporting eLearning courses as SCORM (SCORM 1.2, SCORM 2004) or xAPI packages so that users can upload to an LMS, for example, Moodle.

Apart from the interactive output format, users can export projects to non-interactive ones. It can be images, documents (PDF, Microsoft Word, Microsoft Excel), Microsoft PowerPoint presentations, and videos (AVI, MP4, WMV, WebM). Additionally, ActivePresenter allows importing Microsoft PowerPoint presentations to the project, then exporting to one of its output formats though lacking some animations and effects as well as converting between several video formats indirectly.

Screen Recorder 
Also, ActivePresenter is a powerful screen recorder. It has 2 recording modes: Record Video and Record Software Simulation. 

 Record Video: Users will get a slide containing a full-motion video. 
 Record Software Simulation: It captures all actions on the screen and then converts them into a slide-based project including image slides (mouse click, keystroke) and video slides (mouse scroll, drag-n-drop).

Video Editor 
Besides, ActivePresenter provides users with a plentiful of audio/video editing tools from basic to advanced. After screencasting, users can edit the recorded video with only one tool.

History 
ActivePresenter has been developed by Atomi Systems Inc. since 2007. Version 1.0 was released in October 2008 and became available in the online market six months later with three editions, including a free-of-charge edition.

For more than 10 years of development, ActivePresenter has continuously improved and implemented multiple new features. 

History of major version updates:

 Oct 14, 2011 ActivePresenter 3.0.0
 Jun 27, 2014 ActivePresenter 4.0.0
 Dec 24, 2014 ActivePresenter 5.0.0
 May 24, 2016 ActivePresenter 6.0.0
 Dec 28, 2017 ActivePresenter 7.0.0
 Feb 07, 2020 ActivePresenter 8.0.0
 Sep 27, 2022 ActivePresenter 9.0.0 

Additionally, each major version has many minor updates.

Editions 
Three editions are available at different prices, each having the capabilities of lower ones, plus added features.
The features of the various editions are compared in a table on the ActivePresenter website.

Free Edition 
This edition is free of charge (freeware). It is used for trial and non-commercial purposes. It includes most of the basic features to edit video and allows exporting projects to images or videos. Users can test all features of ActivePresenter without any functionality and time restrictions. It only adds a watermark on the output of non-free features.

Standard Edition 
The Standard edition additionally allows exporting to a series of images, videos, and documents. Interactive features are not supported in this edition. So, if users use them, a watermark will be added to the exported output.

Pro Edition 
This additionally supports interactive simulations and quizzes in HTML5 output.

See also 
Screencast
Comparison of screencasting software

References

External links 

MakeUseOf review of ActivePresenter

Screencasting software
Training